Gerritjan Eggenkamp (14 November 1975) is a Dutch rower.

Born in Leiden, Netherlands, Eggenkamp started rowing aged 12 at Het Spaarne rowing club in Heemstede, and first competed internationally as a Junior, coming 9th in the coxless four at the 1993 Junior World Championships. He was named as the spare man for the Dutch Men's coxless four for the 1996 Olympics, and then rowed in the coxless four at the 1997 and 1998 World Championships. He was in the Dutch men's eight for the 2000 Olympic Games. In 2002, he became the first Dutch rower to compete in the 148th Oxford- Cambridge Boat Race, rowing in the three seat for the winning Oxford crew.

At the 2004 Olympic Games he rowed in the Silver medal winning Dutch Men's 8+.

In September 2018 he was elected treasurer of FISA, the International Rowing Federation.

Rowing achievements
2004: Olympic Games, Athens 8+ (2nd)
2002: Oxford-Cambridge Boat Race (winners)
2001: World Championships (10th) 
2000: Olympic Games, Sydney 8+ (8th) 
1998: World Championships 4- (8th) 
1997: World Championships 4- (7th) 
1996: Olympic Games – spare Men's 4- 
1995: U23 Men's 2- (silver) 
1993: Junior World Championships Men's 4- (9th)

References

External links
Boat Race biography

1975 births
Living people
Dutch male rowers
Olympic rowers of the Netherlands
Rowers at the 1996 Summer Olympics
Rowers at the 2000 Summer Olympics
Rowers at the 2004 Summer Olympics
Sportspeople from Leiden
Delft University of Technology alumni
Olympic medalists in rowing
Medalists at the 2004 Summer Olympics
Oxford University Boat Club rowers
Olympic silver medalists for the Netherlands
20th-century Dutch people
21st-century Dutch people